Puerto Rican singer Ozuna has released six studio albums and 98 singles (including 16 as a featured artist).

Studio albums

Singles

As lead artist

As featured artist

Other charted and certified songs

Other songs

Notes

References 

Discographies of Puerto Rican artists
Ozuna
Discography